The year 1548 in science and technology included a number of events, some of which are listed here.

Events
 February 14 – Battle of Uedahara: Firearms are used for the first time on the battlefield in Japan.
 August 10 – Debate in Milan between mathematicians Lodovico Ferrari and Niccolò Fontana Tartaglia concerning the algebraic method for resolving third-degree equations.
 John Dee starts to study at the Katholieke Universiteit Leuven.

Publications 
 Georgius Agricola – De animantibus subterraneis
 Valerius Cordus –  (posthumous)
 Rembert Dodoens – 
 Gemma Frisius – 
 William Turner – The names of herbes in Greke, Latin, Englishe Duche and Frenche wyth the commune names that Herbaries and Apotecaries use

Births
 April 15 – Pietro Cataldi, Italian mathematician (died 1626)
 Giordano Bruno, Italian Dominican friar, philosopher, mathematician, poet, astrologer and astronomer (k. 1600)
 Abul Qasim ibn Mohammed al-Ghassani, Moroccan physician (died 1610)
 approx. date – Simon Stevin, Flemish scientist (died 1620)

Deaths

References

 
16th century in science
1540s in science